Helen Hellwig won the singles tennis title by defeating reigning champion Aline Terry 7–5, 3–6, 6–0, 3–6, 6–3 in the Challenge Round of the 1894 U.S. Women's National Singles Championship. Hellwig had won the right to challenge Terry by defeating Bertha Toulmin 6–2, 6–5, 6–4 in the final of the All Comers' competition. The event was played on outdoor grass courts and held at the Philadelphia Cricket Club in Chestnut Hill, Philadelphia from June 12 through June 16, 1894.

Draw

Challenge round

All Comers' finals

References

1894
1894 in American women's sports
June 1894 sports events
Women's Singles
1894 in women's tennis
Women's sports in Pennsylvania
Chestnut Hill, Philadelphia
1894 in Pennsylvania